The Hate U Give is a 2018 drama film co-produced and directed by George Tillman Jr., based on the 2017 young adult novel of the same name by Angie Thomas, and stars Amandla Stenberg, Regina Hall, Russell Hornsby, KJ Apa, Sabrina Carpenter, Common, and Anthony Mackie. It is a part of the shared fictional universe Simonverse, on which the novel is based on, it is featured in the Garden Heights series.

The film, as well as the album, featured several R&B and hip hop tracks, from popular artists Tupac Shakur, Kendrick Lamar, Pusha T, Logic, Jadakiss, Travis Scott, Billie Eilish, 21 Savage, Offset, YoungBoy Never Broke Again, Keith Young and the lead actress Stenberg herself. It also had two original songs: the title track, performed by Bobby Sessions, who worked as an executive producer of the soundtrack, and "We Won't Move" by Arlissa. Sessions' contribution to the soundtrack came from his personal experience, following the death of his cousin in a shootout in 2012, and the film follows the same theme, he wanted the music and score "to motivate the audience to speak up against injustice".

The title track served as the lead single for the album, released on the film's limited release date, October 5, 2018, while the album titled The Hate U Give (Original Motion Picture Soundtrack) was published and released by Def Jam Recordings, a week later. The original score is composed by Dustin O'Halloran, which was also released under the title The Hate U Give (Original Motion Picture Score), by Milan Records on the film's release date. Both the score and soundtrack was positively received by critics and audiences.

Original score 
George Tillman Jr. felt that music was critical to the film saying "We're doing a movie about police brutality and about identity. Our performances were honest and authentic. so I needed the score to feel natural and realistic, not too Hollywood". Tillman Jr. recruited Dustin O'Halloran to score for the film, after hearing the score for Lion (2016), which received an Academy Award nomination. Though living outside United States, O'Halloran felt that incidents in the United States is being talked all over the world. He believes in free speech and the right to protest, saying "he wants to be on the right side of history". He called the score as delicate and "to breathe life into the characters and the bigger picture of the subject in a way that was honest and graceful, yet not feel manipulative in any way".

To represent the lead character, Starr, O'Halloran used piano, 40-piece orchestra (conducted by Nicholas Jacobson-Larson) and interspersed electronic elements for the score; he added "The film is following her journey so the idea is the score follows her conflict and the internal part of her, and the piano is definitely one part of that. Piano is so dynamic, such a great way to be singular, and it's so expressive. It can come down and represent a single person, so that ended up working well." An accomplished pianist, he played all the keyboard parts in the score. To represent Starr's family and her connection, he created numerous parts of the score, that felt warm. He added "The family represented in the story is very tight and close. The father is a strong, warm, consistent figure that just there so much for his children."

He added that there is also a tension and a feeling where things could possibly go out of control, especially post the shooting incident, which O'Halloran wanted to explore it in "a visceral and more contemporary way". His idea, initially wanted a full-fledged melodic score, but instead deviated and expanded the score with experimentation using orchestra, creating textures and bowing techniques, and created soundscapes with modulated electronics, so that "everything would be more like a feeling". He felt that working with Tillman Jr. was a highlight in his career, as he got several creative freedom on exploring new ideas and make few changes in the score. According to O'Halloran, "As Starr's journey moves forward, there's also something bigger happening. George was really trying to bring out the sense that things were bigger than her and that was what was helping her with the choices she had to make. It was something we were trying to represent in the score, going from the singular viewpoint but blossoming into something bigger. That's how she realizes she has to take a stand."

O'Halloran worked on the score when the film had a rough edit, and got few changes, "where three quarters of the way, the film was edited". He experimented the score during the film's editing, as "it was a chance to also for them to get music pretty early, before they locked the cut, to understand how it was working and maybe how that could shape the editing as well." He blended the incorporated songs from the soundtrack through the film, with blending modular analog synths. The score was recorded at the Newman Scoring Stage in 20th century Fox in mid-June 2018.

Curated soundtrack 
The head of music at 20th century Fox, Danielle Diego collaborated with Def Jam Recordings, who called it as "the pre-eminent hip-hop label", and said "While the film is a Black Lives Matter story, it's also about a young girl finding her voice. We were trying to find the right artist for the end of the movie, but we also wanted the hip-hop element in the film." Rich Isaacson, the executive vice-president of Def Jam had said that "the title of the film is based on a Tupac song, so it was important that they have Tupac music. Then there were opportunities for Def Jam artists to take the place of temp music, and of course they wanted to have original music that fit the emotions of the film. It worked out amazingly well." Music supervisor Season Kent said she wanted to define these two worlds that she was in and added "Director George Tillman Jr. wanted to set a vibe. These artists have really experienced these things, and talk about it in an honest way."

Def Jam artists Bobby Sessions and Arlissa contributed two original tracks for the album. The latter, who served as the executive producer of the soundtrack, had wrote and performed the title track, based on the real-life experience as his cousin James Harper was fatally shot by a police officer in Dallas in 2012. He used this opportunity to share the message coinciding with the film's theme as he hoped that "the audience will get inspired by the film and feel motivated to speak up against injustice", and further said "We have the power to fix our conditions. This is about right and wrong. I believe this generation will put an end to racism. I'm excited for everyone to watch this film." He added "I measure the success of my music based on how many people feel empowered after digesting the content, and was overwhelmed with the positive feedback that I've received" and felt music as "a tool to get the dialogue started". He also felt that the song and its inclusion in the film, will gain more attention in the awards season.

Arlissa wrote the track "We Won't Move", after watching the film; while calling it as an uplifting track about triumph, Arlissa said that when Starr (Amandla Stenberg) is in a sombre state, she used to listen to depressing music as a form of catharsis. According to her, she used to play sad songs, so that she could tend to be emotional and helps to remove all the negative thoughts, adding that "I'll just get really kind of emotional, but it does kind of help me after I had a good cry. I feel like I can really reset and start again." Diego felt that the message was important, saying "These people are not without hope. It's about community, about family. We needed that emotional moment at the end of the film. It's an empowering moment for Starr. Arlissa captured that."

The song was co-produced by Mike Woods and Kevin White. In an interview to The Hollywood Reporter, the duo said "The title, 'We Won't Move,' says 'We're going to hold our ground, we're going to remain peaceful but vigilant,' " Woods explains. "Also, 'step by step, brick by brick, we're going to face these challenges that we are going through' — lyrically that conveyed what the emotion was for the song and for the scene. We knew as we finished our session that this was a great song with an important message." Initially, they recorded the song with Los Angeles-based musical artist Harloe providing the demo vocals, before Arlissa sung the track. They, however credited Harloe for selling the song to studio.

Release

Marketing 
As a part of promotions, Sessions visited the screenings of the film in United States, including a special premiere at New York City, where he felt emotional on watching the film, and said "I knew there was something of value I could contribute. I want my song to motivate listeners to make the world a better place." Arlissa performed the song "We Won't Move" at the 2018 Toronto International Film Festival, and also at the film's screening in London. Isaacson had said "We're inviting tastemakers, radio personalities, a who's-who in many markets, so we can create a cultural conversation about the film because it's so important to our brand, and to our artists." The titular track was released as a single from the album on October 5, 2018.

The Hate U Give (Original Motion Picture Soundtrack) 
The soundtrack was announced on late-September, and was released by Def Jam Recordings on October 12, 2018, a week before the film's wide release. The album cover art featured a still of Amandla Stenberg, with a red hoodie and black tops holding a billboard that has the title, with a white background surrounding. The cover art inspired from the film's official poster, is applied for the film's score album. The album was released in vinyl on December 21, 2018.

Track listing 
Credits adapted from liner notes and digital booklet.

Additional personnel 
Credits adapted from digital booklet.

Musicians 

 Matt Schaeffer – guitar
 DJ Camper – keyboard
 Cardo – drums
 Yung Exclusive – drums
 Damian Lemar Hudson – background vocals
 Dave Hollister – additional vocals
 Kanye West – additional vocals
 Kendrick Lamar – additional vocals

Technical 

 Blake Harden – recording
 Bobby Campbell – recording, mixing
 Ethan Stevens – recording, mixing
 Finneas O'Connell – recording, mixing
 Noah Goldstein – recording, mixing
 CA$HPASSION – recording
 Jordan Lewis – recording
 Jason Goldberg – assistant engineering 
 Kez Khou – assistant engineering 
 Tristan Bott – assistant engineering 
 Casey Cuayo – assistant engineering 
 Illuminati Hotties – assistant engineering 
 Wes Seidman – assistant engineering 
 Will Wells – assistant engineering
 Carlos Warlick – mixing
 DJ Quik – mixing
 Joe Fitz – mixing
 Mike Dean – mixing, mastering
 Derek Ali – mixing
 Tyler Page – mixing
 Ya Boy N.O.I.S. – mixing
 Tyler Gordon – mixing assistance
 Brian Gardner – mastering 
 Chris Athens – mastering 
 Joe LaPorta – mastering 
 John Greenham – mastering 
 Mike Bozzi – mastering

The Hate U Give (Original Motion Picture Score) 
The score album was released by Milan Records on October 5, 2018, on the day of the film's release.

Track listing

Chart performance

Weekly charts

Year-end charts

Accolades

References 

2018 soundtrack albums
Def Jam Recordings soundtracks
Milan Records soundtracks
Various artists albums
Rhythm and blues soundtracks
Hip hop soundtracks
Pop soundtracks
Albums produced by Cardo (record producer)
Albums produced by Cubeatz
Albums produced by Finneas O'Connell
Albums produced by Hudson Mohawke
Albums produced by Kanye West
Albums produced by Metro Boomin
Albums produced by Mike Will Made It
Film scores